The 1995 Chicago White Sox season was the White Sox's 96th season. They finished with a record of 68-76, good enough for 3rd place in the American League Central, 32 games behind the 1st place Cleveland Indians.

Offseason 
 December 14, 1994: Jack McDowell was traded by the Chicago White Sox to the New York Yankees for a player to be named later and Keith Heberling (minors). The New York Yankees sent Lyle Mouton (April 22, 1995) to the Chicago White Sox to complete the trade.

Regular season

Notable Transactions 
 April 11, 1995: Chris Sabo was signed as a free agent with the Chicago White Sox.
 April 12, 1995: Dave Righetti signed as a free agent with the Chicago White Sox.
 May 18, 1995: John Kruk signed as a free agent with the Chicago White Sox.
 June 5, 1995: Chris Sabo was released by the Chicago White Sox.
 July 27, 1995: Jim Abbott was traded by the Chicago White Sox with Tim Fortugno to the California Angels for McKay Christensen, John Snyder, Andrew Lorraine, and Bill Simas.
 August 18, 1995: Atlee Hammaker was released by the Chicago White Sox.

1995 Opening Day lineup 
 Ray Durham, 2B
 Tim Raines, LF
 Frank Thomas, 1B
 Chris Sabo, DH
 Robin Ventura, 3B
 Mike Devereaux, RF
 Lance Johnson, CF
 Ron Karkovice, C
 Ozzie Guillén, SS
 Alex Fernandez, P

Season standings

Record vs. opponents

Roster

Player stats

Batting 
Note: G = Games played; AB = At bats; R = Runs scored; H = Hits; 2B = Doubles; 3B = Triples; HR = Home runs; RBI = Runs batted in; BB = Base on balls; SO = Strikeouts; AVG = Batting average; SB = Stolen bases

Pitching 
Note: W = Wins; L = Losses; ERA = Earned run average; G = Games pitched; GS = Games started; SV = Saves; IP = Innings pitched; H = Hits allowed; R = Runs allowed; ER = Earned runs allowed; HR = Home runs allowed; BB = Walks allowed; K = Strikeouts

Farm system

References

External links 
 1995 Chicago White Sox at Baseball Reference

Chicago White Sox seasons
Chicago White Sox season
White